Shraddha Arya  (born 17 August 1987) is an Indian actress. She made her film debut as a lead role in SJ Suryah's Tamil film Kalvanin Kadhali along with Nayantara in 2006, in Hindi film Nishabd and in Telugu film Godava with Vaibhav Reddy. She is known for her performances in the Life OK serials Main Lakshmi Tere Aangan Ki, Tumhari Paakhi and Dream Girl. Since 2017, she has been portraying the role of Dr. Preeta Arora in Zee TV's Kundali Bhagya. In 2019, she simultaneously participated in Nach Baliye 9 as a contestant along with Alam Makkar.

Early life 
Arya was in New Delhi, India. She holds a master's degree in economics from University of Mumbai.

Personal life 
In 2015, Arya got engaged to an NRI named Jayant Ratti but the duo called off their engagement due to compatibility issues. She revealed her relationship with Alam Singh Makkar when the couple decided to participate in dance reality show Nach Baliye in 2019. The couple broke up soon after the show finished.

On 16 November 2021, Arya married Indian Navy Officer, Rahul Nagal in an intimate ceremony in her hometown New Delhi.

Career 
Arya started her career with Zee TV's talent hunt show India's Best Cinestars Ki Khoj; she became the first runner-up.

She made her acting debut in 2006 with the Tamil movie Kalvanin Kadhali opposite actor-director S. J. Surya. After that, she ventured into Bollywood with Ram Gopal Varma's Nishabd. She also appeared in the Shahid Kapoor-starrer Paathshaala. She simultaneously ventured into the Telugu industry and did substantial roles in films like Godava, opposite Vaibhav Reddy, Kothi Muka and Romeo. She also performed in Tamil cinema in Kalvanin Kadhali. She has also done two Kannada movies and a Malayalam movie.
In 2011, Arya made her television debut with the Indian soap opera Main Lakshmi Tere Aangan Ki. Her breakthrough performance came in the role of Paakhi in Life OK's Tumhari Pakhi. She further rose to prominence with the role of Ayesha in Dream Girl - Ek Ladki Deewani Si.

She won many awards for her performances in Dream Girl and Tumhari Paakhi, including Indian Telly Award for Best Actress in a Negative Role for Dream Girl, Best Jodi Award at the Zee Gold Awards, Hero of the Month Award by Life OK, and the Women Achievers Award in 2016.

In 2016, Arya hosted a comedy show called Mazaak Mazaak Mein, produced by Ekta Kapoor and Shobha Kapoor.

She is currently appearing in Zee TV's Kundali Bhagya, a spinoff of Kumkum Bhagya. She plays Dr. Preeta Luthra, a physiotherapist. Her performance won her many awards and nominations including Kalakar Award for Best Actress and Best Actress Popular at Gold Awards. Arya has also won Favourite Popular Character Female twice in a row at the Zee Rishtey Awards.

Media 

Shraddha Arya was ranked in The Times 20 Most Desirable Women on Television at No. 16 in 2017, at No. 15 in 2018, at No. 18 in 2019, at No. 14 in 2020.

Filmography

Films

Television

Special appearances

Music videos

Awards and nominations

See also 
List of Hindi television actresses
List of Indian actresses

References

External links 

Living people
Actresses in Telugu cinema
1987 births
Actresses in Hindi cinema
Actresses in Tamil cinema
Actresses in Kannada cinema
Actresses from New Delhi
Actresses in Hindi television
21st-century Indian actresses
Indian actresses
University of Mumbai alumni
Actresses in Malayalam cinema